Teenage Mutant Ninja Turtles III may refer to any of the following  Teenage Mutant Ninja Turtles (TMNT) related media:
Teenage Mutant Ninja Turtles III, live-action film
Teenage Mutant Ninja Turtles III: The Manhattan Project, Nintendo Entertainment System video game
Teenage Mutant Ninja Turtles III: Radical Rescue, Game Boy video game
Teenage Mutant Ninja Turtles 3: Mutant Nightmare, multi-platform video game

See also
 Teenage Mutant Ninja Turtles (disambiguation)

sv:Teenage Mutant Ninja Turtles III